Plexauridae is a family of marine colonial octocorals in the phylum Cnidaria. Members of this family are found in shallow tropical and subtropical seas. Many species contain symbiotic photosynthetic protists called zooxanthellae.

Characteristics
The Plexauridae have a branching colony form and many are known as sea rods or sea fans. The axial core of the coral skeleton is horny and hollow, and contains no sclerites. This is covered by a layer of tissue called coenenchyme in which is embedded calcareous sclerites. The sclerites are very varied in form in the Plexauridae, and examination of their morphology is helpful in identifying the different species. The calyces in which the polyps sit are strengthened by further sclerites and have eight fine dividing walls called septa. The polyps each have eight pinnate tentacles.

Genera
The World Register of Marine Species includes these genera in this family:

Acanthacis Deichmann, 1936
Acanthomuricea Hentschel, 1903
Acis Duchassaing & Michelotti, 1860
Alaskagorgia Sánchez & Cairns, 2004
Anthomuricea Studer, 1887
Anthoplexaura Kükenthal, 1908
Astrogorgia Verrill, 1868
Astromuricea Germanos, 1895
Bayergorgia Williams & Lopez-Gonzalez, 2005
Bebryce Philippi, 1841
Chromoplexaura Williams, 2013
Cryogorgia Williams, 2005
Dentomuricea Grasshoff, 1977
Discogorgia Kükenthal, 1919
Echinogorgia Kölliker, 1865
Echinomuricea Verrill, 1869
Elasmogorgia Wright & Studer, 1889
Eunicea Lamouroux, 1816
Euplexaura Verrill, 1869
Heterogorgia Verrill, 1868
Hypnogorgia Duchassaing & Michelotti, 1864
Lapidogorgia Grasshoff, 1999
Lepidomuricea Kükenthal, 1919
Lytreia Bayer, 1981
Menacella Gray, 1870
Menella Gray, 1870
Mesogligorgia Lopez-Gonzalez, 2007
Muricea Lamouroux, 1821
Muriceides Wright & Studer, 1889
Muriceopsis Aurivillius, 1931
Paracis Kükenthal, 1919
Paramuricea Koelliker, 1865
Paraplexaura Kükenthal, 1909
Placogorgia Wright & Studer, 1889
Plexaura Lamouroux, 1821
Plexaurella Kölliker, 1865
Plexauroides Wright & Studer
Plexauropsis Verrill
Psammogorgia Verrill, 1868
Pseudoplexaura Wright & Studer, 1889
Pseudothesea Kükenthal, 1919
Scleracis Kükenthal, 1919
Spinimuricea Grasshoff, 1992
Swiftia Duchassaing & Michelotti, 1864
Thesea Duchassaing & Michelotti, 1860
Trimuricea Gordon, 1926
Villogorgia Duchassaing & Michelloti, 1862

References

 
Holaxonia
Cnidarian families